The Spanish question was the set of geopolitical and diplomatic circumstances that marked the relationship between Spain and the United Nations between 1945 and 1955, centred on the UN's refusal to admit Spain to the organization due to Francoist Spain's sympathy for the Axis powers, defeated in World War II.

Background

When World War II began on September 1, 1939, Francoist Spain proclaimed that Spain would remain neutral. The German victories over Holland, Belgium and France in June 1940 and Italy's entry into the war on the German side (on June 10), however, changed the situation. Thus, on June 13, 1940, when the Germans were about to enter Paris, Franco abandoned "strict neutrality" and declared himself "non-belligerent", which was the status that Italy had before entering war. The next day the Spanish troops occupied Tangier, an international city that was incorporated in fact to the Spanish Protectorate of Morocco. In late June 1941, the Francoist regime decided to participate in the "anti-communist crusade", i.e., the invasion of the USSR by the Axis, by sending a Spanish infantry division composed of volunteers, known as the Blue Division, to the Russian front.

In November 1942 British and American troops landed in North Africa to dislodge the German Afrika Korps and the Italian troops. For Franco it was the end of his putative aspirations of conquest and a possible risk of invasion by the allies given their alignment with Germany and Italy. It would not be until the fall of Mussolini in July 1943, after the allied landing in Sicily, when General Franco returned to "strict neutrality" against his wishes, ordering in November the withdrawal of the Blue Division from the Russian front.

Due to Franco's sympathy with the Axis powers, the winners of the war excluded Spain from the post-war international order.

Origins

The Spanish question arose at the San Francisco Conference. During that conference, on the initiative of the delegations of Australia and Mexico, a motion was adopted which, without explicitly mentioning Spain, referred to it with these terms:

Spain was not present at the conference. However, prominent Spanish Republican leaders did attend the conference, exerting a notorious influence on several delegations, extended to the conditions of entry into the United Nations.

At the Potsdam Conference, the question of how to proceed with post-war Spain was one of the first to be dealt with. In this sense, Stalin was, in a certain way, seeking revenge against the Francoist State, due in part to the fact that the State had sent the Blue Division (volunteers fighting with the German armed forces) to the Soviet Union during World War II.

At this conference, the three winning powers in World War II (United States, Great Britain and Soviet Union) issued a statement on the matter:

Resolution 39

At the UN, the issue of Spain was one of the first to be addressed by the organization, on the initiative of the Polish delegation. Between May and June 1946, the UN Security Council made a study on the political situation in Spain, arriving at the following conclusions:

 Franco's regime was fascist in nature, established with the help of the Nazi regime in Germany and the fascist regime in Italy.
 Despite allied protests, Franco aided the Axis Powers by sending the Blue Division to the Soviet Union and seizing Tangier in 1940.
 Franco, along with Hitler and Mussolini, was guilty of the conspiracy that resulted in the World War II, in which the belligerency of Franco was postponed until the moment that it mutually agreed to one another.

Convinced that the Francoist State was imposed on the Spanish people by force with the help of the Axis powers (which it helped during the war) and did not represent the Spanish people, making it impossible to participate in international affairs of the Spanish people with The United Nations, on December 12, 1946, the General Assembly adopted Resolution 39, which excluded the Spanish government from international organizations and conferences established by the United Nations. In addition, the resolution recommended that the Security Council take the necessary measures if, within a "reasonable time", no new Government was established whose authority emanated from the consent of the governed. Likewise, the resolution recommended the immediate withdrawal of ambassadors accredited to the Government of Spain. The resolution was adopted with 34 votes in favour, 6 votes against, 13 abstentions and one absence.

The day after the adoption of the resolution, the Francoist State responded with a large demonstration in the Plaza de Oriente vindicating national pride in the face of foreign hostility and appealing to the Spanish people's self-sufficiency. These sanctions failed to weaken Francoist Spain, which in domestic politics reacted to a propaganda campaign that managed to strengthen Franco by stirring up the spectre of "foreign interference." Neither did internationally have great effects, beyond constituting a symbol of international ostracism of the Spanish State. Some countries (especially Argentina) did not abide by the recommendation to withdraw their ambassadors, while many others simply left their delegations in charge of chargés d'affaires. In addition, the Francoist State overcame the storm through the so-called substitution policies, bridging with Spanish-American republics and Arab countries in the hope that the Western countries, driven by the Cold War, rectify their attitude towards Spain.

Voting

For

Australia, Belgium, Bolivia, Brazil, Byelorussian SSR, Chile, China, Czechoslovakia, Denmark, Ethiopia, France, Guatemala, Haiti, Iceland, India, Iran, Liberia, Luxembourg, Mexico, New Zealand, Nicaragua, Norway, Panama, Paraguay, Philippines, Poland, Sweden, Ukrainian SSR, United Kingdom, United States, Uruguay, USSR, Venezuela, Yugoslavia.

Against

Argentina, Costa Rica, Dominican Republic, Ecuador, El Salvador, Peru.

Abstentions

Afghanistan, Canada, Colombia, Cuba, Egypt, Greece, Honduras, Lebanon, Netherlands, Saudi Arabia, South Africa, Syria, Turkey.

Absent

Iraq.

Resolution 386

However, the Cold War caused the US government to change its attitude towards Francoist Spain, considering that Spain, due to its geographical situation and anti-communist government, would be a valuable asset to the so-called "free world" plans. Under these conditions, Spain was gaining sympathy among several member countries of the UN. In January 1950, the American newspaper The New York Times published a letter of the Secretary of State Dean Acheson in which admits that the resolution 39 has been a failure, mentioning that the government was able to support a resolution that would end both issues. However, the Francoist State continued to be condemned on the grounds that the policy pursued had been erroneous, but not in the moral condemnation of Franco's reign, which explains why the United States excluded Spain from the Marshall Plan and did not invite it to join NATO.

On November 4, 1950, the General Assembly adopted resolution 386, which revoked the recommendation for the withdrawal of ambassadors accredited to the Spanish government while repealing the recommendation that prevented Spain from being a member of the International agencies established or linked by the United Nations. The resolution was adopted with 38 votes in favour, 10 against, 12 abstentions and no absences.

Voting

For

Afghanistan, Argentina, Belgium, Bolivia, Brazil, Canada, Chile, China, Colombia, Costa Rica, Dominican Republic, Ecuador, Egypt, El Salvador, Greece, Haiti, Honduras, Iceland, Iran, Iraq, Lebanon, Liberia, Luxembourg, Netherlands, Nicaragua, Pakistan, Panama, Paraguay, Peru, Philippines, Saudi Arabia, South Africa, Syria, Thailand, Turkey, United States, Venezuela, Yemen.

Against

Byelorussian SSR, Czechoslovakia, Guatemala, Israel, Mexico, Poland, Ukrainian SSR, Uruguay, USSR, Yugoslavia.

Abstentions

Australia, Burma, Cuba, Denmark, Ethiopia, France, India, Indonesia, New Zealand, Norway, Sweden, United Kingdom.

Absent

None.

Conclusion

This resolution paved the way for Spain to join the United Nations system, which began in 1951 with the incorporation of agencies such as UPU, ITU, FAO and WHO, and completed with the accession of Spain to the UN in 1955.

See also

 United Nations Security Council Resolution 4
 United Nations Security Council Resolution 7
 Dates of establishment of diplomatic relations with Francoist Spain

References

Foreign relations of Spain during the Francoist dictatorship
1945 in Spain
1946 in Spain
1951 in Spain
1955 in Spain
United Nations General Assembly resolutions
History of the United Nations
Spain and the United Nations
1945 in international relations
1951 in international relations
1946 in international relations
Aftermath of World War II